The 1925 Far Eastern Championship Games was the seventh edition of the regional multi-sport event, contested between China, Japan and the Philippines, and was held from 17 to 22 May in Manila, the Philippines. A total of eight sports were contested over the course of the five-day event.

China won the football tournament for a sixth consecutive time.

Participants

Sports

References

Far Eastern Championship Games
Far Eastern Championship Games
Far Eastern Championship Games
Far Eastern Championship Games
Sports competitions in Manila
20th century in Manila
International sports competitions hosted by the Philippines
Multi-sport events in the Philippines
Far Eastern Championship Games